Juan Orlando Mercedes Sena (born 16 June 1957) is a politician and engineer from the Dominican Republic. He is Senator for the province of Independencia, elected in 2006, and re-elected in 2010 with 68% of the votes —the highest percentage achieved for a Senator—.

Mariotti was Governor-Civilian of Independencia from 1998 to 2000.

References 

Living people
1957 births
People from Independencia Province
Dominican Liberation Party politicians
Dominican Republic engineers
Members of the Senate of the Dominican Republic